Limopsis sulcata, common name the Sulcate limopsis, is a species of very small clam, a marine bivalve mollusk in the family Limopsidae. This species occurs along the Atlantic coast of North America from Massachusetts to the West Indies.

References

Limopsidae
Molluscs described in 1898